Sleeman Centre may refer to:

 Sleeman Centre (Brisbane), a sporting and entertainment complex in Brisbane, Queensland, Australia
 Sleeman Centre (Guelph), a sports and entertainment hockey arena in Guelph, Ontario, Canada
 Sleeman Sports Centre, a former name of the Chandler Arena, Brisbane